Zakaria Labyad (Riffian-Berber: ⵣⴰⵎⴰⵔⵉⵢⴰ ⵍⴱⵢⴰⴷ; born  9 March 1993) is a professional footballer who plays as an attacking midfielder for FC Utrecht. Born in the Netherlands, he represented that nation at under-17 level before switching his allegiance to Morocco and playing for them at under-23 level.

Club career

PSV
Born in Utrecht, Labyad came through the youth program of PSV. In January 2009, he extended his contract with PSV until the summer of 2012. Before joining PSV, Labyad played for USV Elinkwijk. Labyad made his debut in the senior team on 25 February 2010 in a UEFA Europa League home match against Hamburger SV, coming on as a substitute for Otman Bakkal in the 71st minute. Three days later, Labyad also made his debut in the Eredivisie, coming on as a substitute for Balázs Dzsudzsák in a match against RKC Waalwijk. On 18 April 2010, Labyad made his first appearance in the starting line-up in a home match against FC Groningen. Labyad's selection in the starting line-up paid immediate dividends, with him scoring two goals in the 3–1  victory. In the last match of the 2009–10 season, Labyad was again in the starting lineup in a 1–1 draw against Alkmaar. Labyad more or less became a regular in the starting 11 in the 2011–12 season and experienced a great deal of success. He played in 32 matches and scored 6 goals. He scored a goal in the KNVB Beker semi final against Heerenveen and followingly won the cup with PSV.

Sporting CP
On 3 April 2012, Sporting CP's president revealed that Labyad will join the Portuguese team for the 2012–13 season, on a free transfer, signing a 5-year deal contract. However, on 23 May, PSV's technical director Marcel Brands told Dutch media that Labyad's contract was extended for another year since Labyad failed to formally terminate his contract before the legal deadline of 15 May.

On 2 July 2012, he officially joined Sporting. In his first season, he made 27 appearances for the club in which he scored three times.

Vitesse (loan)
In January 2014, after not playing a single match for Sporting during the first half of the season, Labyad was sent on loan to Dutch side Vitesse until the summer of 2015.

Return to Sporting CP
Labyad returned to Sporting CP for the 2015–16 Primeira Liga season to work with new Sporting CP manager Jorge Jesus who insisted upon Labyad's return as part of him agreeing to accept the Sporting CP job offer. Indeed, Labyad was viewed as a "pilar" for the new Sporting CP by Jorge Jesus.

Fulham (loan)
On 1 February 2016, Labyad moved on loan to Fulham until the end of the 2015–16 season. On 31 August 2016, Sporting CP announced that both parties had agreed to terminate the contract.

Utrecht
On 5 January 2017, Labyad signed for Eredivisie side FC Utrecht until 2019.

AFC Ajax
On 14 May 2018, Labyad signed for Eredivisie side AFC Ajax. He signed a four-season contract until June 2022.

Return to Utrecht
On 20 February 2023, Labyad signed a one-and-a-half-year contract with FC Utrecht, with an option to extend for an additional season.

Personal life
Labyad has said that he looks up to former PSV team-mate Ibrahim Afellay, stating “Ibrahim is my friend. I have a lot of respect for him, not only because he plays in the same position as me, but also because as a person, he’s someone I look up to.” During his time at PSV, Labyad lived in Utrecht with his family, so he had to commute by train every day to Eindhoven. He followed an education in "Sport & Activity" at the ROC Eindhoven.

Career statistics

Club

Honours

PSV
KNVB Cup: 2011–12

Ajax
Eredivisie: 2018–19, 2020–21,  2021–22 
KNVB Cup: 2018–19, 2020–21
Johan Cruyff Shield: 2019

Individual
 Eredivisie Player of the Month: November 2017

References

External links
 Zakaria Labyad at Voetbal International 

1993 births
Living people
Footballers from Utrecht (city)
Association football midfielders
Moroccan footballers
Morocco international footballers
Moroccan expatriate footballers
Dutch footballers
Dutch sportspeople of Moroccan descent
USV Elinkwijk players
PSV Eindhoven players
Sporting CP footballers
SBV Vitesse players
Fulham F.C. players
FC Utrecht players
AFC Ajax players
Eredivisie players
Eerste Divisie players
Primeira Liga players
English Football League players
Expatriate footballers in Portugal
Olympic footballers of Morocco
Footballers at the 2012 Summer Olympics
Dutch expatriate footballers
Dutch expatriate sportspeople in Portugal
Dutch expatriate sportspeople in England
Moroccan expatriate sportspeople in England
Moroccan expatriate sportspeople in Portugal
Expatriate footballers in England